Deuce High is a 1926 American silent Western film directed by Richard Thorpe and starring Buffalo Bill Jr. (a.k.a. Jay Wilsey).

Preserved in the UCLA, Library of Congress and Cinematheque Royale (Brussels) archives.

Cast
 Jay Wilsey - Ted Crawford (* aka Buffalo Bill Jr.)
 Alma Rayford - Neil Clifton
 Robert Walker - Ranger McLeod
 J. P. Lockney - Mandell Armstrong
 Harry Lord - Jim Blake

References

External links
 Deuce High at IMDb.com
 

1926 films
Films directed by Richard Thorpe
1926 Western (genre) films
American black-and-white films
Silent American Western (genre) films
1920s English-language films
1920s American films